Sir Lewis Edward Emerson (May 12, 1890 – May 19, 1949) was a lawyer, judge and political figure in Newfoundland. He represented Placentia East from 1928 to 1932 and St. John's East from 1932 to 1934 in the Newfoundland and Labrador House of Assembly.

He was born in St. John's, the son of George Henry Emerson. He was educated at St. Patrick's Hall, at Saint Bonaventure's College and at Ampleforth College in England. Emerson was called to the bar in 1913 and practised in St. John's. He served in the dominion's cabinet as a minister without portfolio in 1924, as Minister of Justice from 1932 to 1934. In the Commission of Government he  was Commissioner of Defence from 1940 to 1944 and Commissioner for Justice and Attorney General from 1937 to 1940. In 1944, he was knighted. He was Chief Justice of Newfoundland and Labrador from 1944 to 1949, thus being the first Chief Justice of the new province of Newfoundland and Labrador when the Dominion of Newfoundland joined Canada in 1949.

He died in St. John's in 1949.

References 

Canadian Knights Bachelor
Members of the Newfoundland and Labrador House of Assembly
1890 births
1949 deaths
Members of the Newfoundland Commission of Government
Dominion of Newfoundland judges
Government ministers of the Dominion of Newfoundland
Attorneys-General of the Dominion of Newfoundland
People educated at Ampleforth College